Independence Square (Belarusian: Плошча Незалежнасці, Russian: Площадь независимости) is a square in Minsk, Belarus. It is one of the landmarks on Independence Avenue. The National Assembly of Belarus and Minsk City Hall are on this square. During the period of the Byelorussian Soviet Socialist Republic it was called Lenin Square. It is currently one of the largest squares in Europe.

History 

The square was designed by Iosif Langbard and was created for conducting rallies and to serve as Minsk's main ceremonial venue during the Soviet times. During World War II most buildings that were on the square were destroyed by the Nazis. From 1946 to 1984 October Square replaced Lenin Square as the city's main venue. A project for the reconstruction of Independence Square was launched after the fall of the USSR. The first stage was completed in 2002. The transportation scheme of the area was then changed. Two more pedestrian underpasses as well as the underground shopping mall "Stolica" were constructed.

Events

Parades
In the Soviet era, military parades in honor of International Workers' Day (1 May) (until 1969), Victory Day (9 May), and October Revolution Day (7 November) took place on the square since it was used as the city's general parade venue until 1984. The First Secretary of the Communist Party of Belarus and members of the politburo would get on top of a grandstand in front of a statue of Lenin. These types of parades would go on until 1989. The first parade of the independent Republic of Belarus was on Independence Square in 1995, in honor of golden jubilee of the signing of the German Instrument of Surrender.

Demonstrations
In the Soviet era, many pro-Communist rallies took place. A rally in honor of the 100th birthday of Vladimir Lenin ran at the square on 22 April 1970. Rallies in honor of Minsk's 900th anniversary also took place in 1967.

2020 protests

During the 2020 Belarusian protests, the square was an area where many rallies occurred. President Lukashenko addressed supporters of him on the square hours before tens of thousands of opposition protesters began gathering in the same area. Lukashenko told his supporters "to defend your country and its independence". Lukashenko's son Nikolai was compared to a bodyguard due to him wearing a jacket, white shirt and sunglasses. During the protests, many shouted and chanted "Leave!", referring to demands for Lukashenko's resignation.

On 9 August, the Minsk City Police Department closed central Independence Square in front of the buildings of the government and the Central Election Commission.

Other 
In 1980, the state funeral of the First Secretary of the Communist Party of Byelorussia Pyotr Masherov took place on the square. On 8 September 1992, the Minsk Higher Military Engineering School and the Minsk Higher Military Command School (now the unified Military Academy of Belarus) were the first to take the military oath of allegiance to the armed forces, with their induction ceremony being held on Independence Square in the presence of defense minister Pavel Kozlovskii.

Landmarks

Buildings

Others
 Maxim Tank Belarusian State Pedagogical University
 Minsk Metro headquarters
 Minsk Mayor’s Office
 Former commercial apartment buildings of the early 20th century
 Lenin Statue outside the Government headquarter
Shopping mall "Stoliсa" (located underground)

References 

Squares in Minsk
National squares